Oldpark is one of the nine district electoral areas (DEA) in Belfast, Northern Ireland. Located in the North of the city, the district elects six members to Belfast City Council and contains the wards of Ardoyne; Ballysillan; Cliftonville; Legoniel; New Lodge and Water Works. Oldpark forms part of the Belfast North constituency for the Northern Ireland Assembly and UK Parliament.

History
The DEA was created for the 1985 local elections. Legoniel, Ballysillan and Ardoyne wards had previously been part of Area E, New Lodge and the southern half of the Waterworks ward had been in Area G, while Cliftonville and the northern half of Waterworks ward had been in Area H.

Wards

Councillors

2019 Elections
2014: 3 × Sinn Féin, 1 × SDLP, 1 × DUP, 1 × PUP

2019: 3 × Sinn Féin, 1 × SDLP, 1 × DUP, 1 × People Before Profit

2014-2019 Change: People Before Profit gain from PUP

2014 Elections
2014: 3 x Sinn Féin, 1 x DUP, 1 x SDLP, 1 x PUP

See also
Belfast City Council
Electoral wards of Belfast
Local government in Northern Ireland
Members of Belfast City Council

References

Electoral wards of Belfast
1985 establishments in Northern Ireland